Lynceus or Lynkeus may refer to:

 Lynceus of Samos, Greek writer
 Josef Popper-Lynkeus (1838-1922), Austrian scholar and inventor
 Lynceus, name of multiple Greek mythological figures.
 Lynceus (crustacean), a crustacean genus